Reunification Day, Victory Day, Liberation Day ( or ), or the official name Day of Southern Liberation for National Reunification is a public holiday in Vietnam that marks the event when North Vietnamese and Việt Cộng forces captured Saigon (now Ho Chi Minh City, capital of South Vietnam) on 30 April 1975. This signalled the end of the Vietnam War. It was the start of the transition period toward reunification, which occurred in the national election for national reunification on 2 July 1976, when the Republic of South Vietnam and North Vietnam merged, forming the modern-day Vietnam.

In some of the overseas Vietnamese community, the day is remembered as the Fall of Saigon, Black April, National Day of Shame or National Day of Hate. This is a commemorative day for exiled Vietnamese who served, were affected, and displaced in those overseas communities, and as such is a day of reflection. Many Americans of multiple ethnicities observe the day for remembrance and solidarity.

Gallery

See also
 1954 division of Vietnam
 Liberation Day in other countries
 Unity Day (disambiguation) in other countries
 Victory Day in other countries

Videos
 A 2015 Reunification Day Parade in Ho Chi Minh city

References

Public holidays in Vietnam
April observances
Vietnam